Ignace-François de Glymes-Brabant  (29 March 1677 - 5 November 1755) was a Flemish born general in the service of Imperial Spain.

Family

He was born one of the 12 children of Gilles II Alexis de Glymes-Brabant; Lord of la Falize at Namur, then part of the Spanish Netherlands. His grandmother Marie-Elisabeth of Nassau-Corroy, was the daughter of Alexis II of Nassau-Corroy, great-grandson of Henry III of Nassau-Breda. He married Marie-Francoise de Warigny and had 2 sons:
 Honoré de Glymes-Brabant (1725-1804); Viceroy of Navarre in 1765:married to Marie-Theodore, daughter of Charles I Emmanuel, 1st Prince de Gavre. 
 Jean-Alexis de Glymes-Brabant: Abbot in Dinant.

Career 
He came earlier to Spain as a colonel of a Walloon Regiment financed by Imperial Spain,  to fight in the Spanish War of Succession in 1703, the siege of Gibraltar (1704–1707), participating also in the siege of Tortosa, Tarragona, in 1711, where he was promoted to the rank of lieutenant general.

He was Military Governor of Tortosa in 1715, Captain General of Old Castile in 1727 and the Captain General of Catalonia (1735–1743), being substituted for the period 1737 - 1738 by Prospero Jorge de Verboom.

In 1743 he was made 1st Count of Glimes de Brabante by King Philip V of Spain.

He died at Madrid in 1755.

1677 births
1745 deaths
People from Namur (city)
Counts of Spain
Flemish nobility
Spanish generals
Ignacio
Military personnel of the Spanish Netherlands